John Sturgill Simpson (born June 8, 1978) is an American country music singer-songwriter and actor. As of February 2022, he has released seven albums as a solo artist. His first two albums, High Top Mountain and Metamodern Sounds in Country Music, were independently released in 2013 and 2014, respectively. The latter was nominated for a Grammy Award for Best Americana Album, listed 18th on Rolling Stones "50 Best Albums of 2014," and named among "NPR's 50 Favorite Albums of 2014." His third album, A Sailor's Guide to Earth, was released in April 2016 on Atlantic Records and was Simpson's first major-label release, later earning him Best Country Album at the 59th Grammy Awards while also being nominated for Album of the Year. Simpson's fourth album, Sound & Fury, was released on September 27, 2019, and was nominated for a Grammy Award for Best Rock Album at the 63rd Grammy Awards. He released two albums in 2020 - Cuttin' Grass, Vol. 1 and Vol. 2 - which feature bluegrass interpretations of songs from across his catalog, and marked his return to independent music. His seventh studio album, The Ballad of Dood and Juanita, was released in August 2021. Simpson's style has been met with critical favor and frequent comparisons to outlaw country.

Early life
John Sturgill Simpson was born in Jackson, Breathitt County, Kentucky. His given name, Sturgill, stems from his paternal grandmother's maiden name which originates from the town she was born in, Wurtland, Kentucky. His father was  a Kentucky State Police Trooper who formerly worked undercover. Due to his father's work, Simpson's family moved to Versailles, outside Lexington, where Simpson attended Woodford County High School. His mother's family were coal miners, and he is the first male on her side of the family to not work in a strip mine or deep mine.

Simpson says of his educational career that he was "not a great student".  His parents divorced when he was in the seventh grade. He only "barely graduated" from Woodford High, enlisting in the United States Navy in his senior year. After three years in the Navy, where he worked in the Combat Information Center of a frigate, Simpson spent some time in Japan. He later lived in Everett and Seattle, Washington, where he waited tables at IHOP, before moving back home to Lexington, Kentucky.

Career

2004−2013: Early performances and recordings 
Simpson formed the Country/Rock band Sunday Valley in 2004, which played at the Pickathon festival in Portland, Oregon. He later moved to Nashville, but says he "didn't have the foggiest notion of how to hustle my music ... [it] was a total bust."

Setting his musical ambitions aside, Simpson focused on building a career at a Salt Lake City railroad freight-shipping yard for Union Pacific Railroad, which he eventually ended up managing. He credits his wife and friends with changing what he characterized as a hobbyist focus on songwriting and playing to convincing him to get serious about music as a potential career. After playing local open mics and gigs, Simpson returned to Sunday Valley, touring and making an album with the band. He and his wife moved to Nashville when the group disbanded in 2012.

After going solo, Simpson released his debut album High Top Mountain in 2013, which he self-funded, self-released, and had cut in Nashville. The album was produced by Dave Cobb. Among the session musicians were Hargus "Pig" Robbins on piano and Robby Turner, a former guitarist for Waylon Jennings, on steel guitar. The record is named after a cemetery near Jackson where many of Simpson's family members are buried. Stephen Thomas Erlewine of AllMusic rated High Top Mountain 3 stars out of 5, comparing its sound favorably to Waylon Jennings. The album's style has also been compared to that of Merle Haggard. Erik Ernst of the Milwaukee Journal-Sentinel also compared it to Jennings, saying that it had "rich vintage sounds, heartbreaking ballads, and juke-joint ramblers".

2014–2016: Metamodern Sounds in Country Music
In 2014, Simpson released his second album, again produced by Dave Cobb, Metamodern Sounds in Country Music, to positive reviews. The lead single was "Living the Dream". The album has been described as "flesh[ing] out a deep and unconventional relationship between traditionalism and new ways of thinking," and a departure from Simpson's more traditional hard country debut. Simpson said that "recording and mixing was done in five and a half days for about $4,000. I was pretty proud about that." The album was ranked as one of the ten best of the year by The New York Times writer Nate Chinen. Metamodern Sounds in Country Music received a Grammy nomination for Best Americana Album in 2014.

Simpson made his US network television debut on July 14, 2014, on the Late Show with David Letterman, playing "Life of Sin". That year, he would go on to play "Living the Dream" on a September episode of Conan, "Turtles All the Way Down" on an October episode of The Tonight Show Starring Jimmy Fallon, and "The Promise" on a December episode of Late Night with Seth Meyers. In 2015, he returned to The Late Show and Conan, respectively playing "Long White Line" in February and "Just Let Go" in April. He played the Grand Ole Opry, and  he also opened for Willie Nelson at Austin City Limits. In late 2015, he was the opening act for Merle Haggard.

His cover of "The Promise" by 1980s band When In Rome was featured in the Season 2 Episode 9 of the HBO series The Leftovers in November 2015. The first track from this album, "Turtles All The Way Down," was featured in the soundtrack for Season 1 Episode 5 of HBO's series Watchmen in November 2019. Simpson also wrote and performed "Sugar Daddy", the theme song to the Martin Scorsese/Mick Jagger-produced TV show, Vinyl. As of July 2015, Simpson's songs are represented by Downtown Music Publishing—an agreement that followed his record deal with Atlantic Records in 2015.

2016–2017: A Sailor's Guide to Earth

In March 2016, Simpson released the first track from his third album, A Sailor's Guide To Earth, a song called "Brace For Impact (Live a Little)", with the album itself released in April. The album, which was recorded live, has been described as a "heartfelt" guide to living from Simpson to his infant son, and Simpson produced it himself, replacing Dave Cobb, the producer of his two previous records. It features work by The Dap-Kings from Brooklyn's Daptone Records, as well as a cover of Nirvana's "In Bloom." Sailor's Guide, which marked Simpson's major label debut, was nominated for Album of the Year and won Best Country Album at the 59th Grammy Awards. In January 2017, Simpson appeared on the Felicity Jones-hosted episode of Saturday Night Live, playing "Keep It Between the Lines" and "Call to Arms." On November 8, 2017, Simpson livestreamed himself busking and meeting fans outside the Bridgestone Arena in Nashville during the Country Music Association Awards ceremony, as a tongue-in-cheek response to his not being nominated for or invited to that year's awards.

Simpson had planned to take a break from touring for the entirety of 2017 to focus on his family, but reconsidered after his Grammy nominations. He began touring again in May 2017 by playing a show at the Wharf Amphitheater in Orange Beach, Alabama, with Margo Price. He also performed as the opening act for three shows during the Guns N' Roses "Not in this Lifetime" tour in the summer of 2017. Simpson later stated that he was "talked into" returning to touring, despite his family commitments and feelings of exhaustion. While on the road in 2017, he suffered from a relapse of substance abuse and depression, though after the tour's conclusion, he reconnected with his wife "in a very profound and intense way" and also devoted more time to his children.

Simpson helped produce fellow Kentucky singer/songwriter Tyler Childers' 2017 album Purgatory after being introduced to Childers by drummer Miles Miller. Simpson would work with Childers again as producer on his next album, 2019's Country Squire.

2018–2020: Sound & Fury and Cuttin' Grass
In a March 5, 2018, interview on The Joe Rogan Experience podcast, Simpson revealed that he was working on his fourth studio album, and hinted that it would be a double album, though this was ultimately not the case. The title, Sound & Fury, was announced on July 21, 2019, at the San Diego Comic-Con, with Simpson describing it as a "sleazy, steamy rock'n'roll record". A companion anime film bearing the same name was also released on Netflix. The album was officially made available for pre-order on August 20, 2019, with the track "Sing Along" being released the same day. The album itself was released to positive reviews on September 27. It was released under the Elektra Records label, which Simpson was transferred to in 2018 following his time at Atlantic Records. Breaking with Simpson's established country style, it featured a fuzzy hard rock sound augmented by extensive use of synthesizers, influenced by psychedelia, funk, and electronic rock. The tracks "Sing Along" and "A Good Look" both featured music videos which included clips from the anime. Pitchfork praised the album as "synth-rock at its scuzziest".

In a 2020 interview, Simpson described Sound & Fury as a record born from "burnout," especially in reaction to his 2017 tours, as well as the realization that he had become disillusioned with the music industry. He cut off contact with Elektra and refused to give them any material after the release of Sound & Fury. Simpson claimed that Elektra "[did not] know what the fuck to do" with him, as he created Sound & Fury to be difficult to market, and left Elektra with a "giant un-recouped debt" upwards of a million dollars from costs relating to the album's companion film, which was similarly hard to promote. In the same interview, Simpson heavily criticized record labels, calling them overly controlling yet noncontributory, and claimed that he was manipulated into signing a record contract by people who were no longer in his life. He also claimed that his Grammy nominations for A Sailor's Guide To Earth were a scheme for the record labels to get a return on their investment, and had nothing to do with him or his music, referencing frequent criticisms of bias and "secret committees" within the Grammys.

Simpson was originally going to perform at the Woodstock 50 music festival in August 2019, before the festival's cancellation.

On October 16, 2020, Simpson released his first bluegrass album, titled Cuttin' Grass Vol. 1: The Butcher Shoppe Sessions. The album features 20 songs, including bluegrass renditions of tracks culled from his first three albums, as well as songs dating back to his mid-2000s band Sunday Valley. The album was Simpson's first collaboration with Thirty Tigers (a distribution label for independent artists), whom he began to work with after ending his contract with Elektra. The album was officially released through High Top Mountain Records, a label that Simpson owns, and it was marketed and distributed by Thirty Tigers. On December 11, 2020, Simpson released Cuttin' Grass, Vol. 2, consisting of 12 more bluegrass recordings that Simpson was "too afraid to do on volume 1." The Cuttin' Grass series marked a return to independent music for Simpson, who stated "I'm realizing more and more every day what I already knew, which is that I was always supposed to be an independent artist."

2021–present: The Ballad of Dood and Juanita
Simpson released the concept album The Ballad of Dood and Juanita on August 20, 2021. He described the album as "traditional country, bluegrass and mountain music, including gospel and a cappella." It was written and recorded in less than one week, alongside the same musicians Simpson worked with for the Cuttin' Grass series.

In an interview with Rolling Stone released upon the album's debut, Simpson stated that The Ballad of Dood and Juanita would be the last record he wished to release under his own name, claiming "this is the last Sturgill record." The Ballad of Dood and Juanita concluded a five-album "arc" he had envisioned and previously committed to, consisting of his five main albums and minus the Cuttin' Grass series. However, Simpson also expressed a desire to form a proper band with several musicians he respects, believing that it would be more "democratic" in terms of creativity. In September 2021, Simpson cancelled his remaining tour dates for the rest of the year after suffering a vocal cord hemorrhage.

Acting career
Simpson made his acting debut with a cameo in the 2011 indie film Orca Park. In 2018, he also had a role in the short film Black Hog Gut. He secured his first substantial role the same year, appearing in several episodes of the CBS All Access television series One Dollar, in which he plays the part of Ken Fry, a laid-off steel mill worker who sells stolen goods. In 2019, he wrote and performed the theme song for Jim Jarmusch's horror-comedy movie The Dead Don't Die, in which he also appeared as "Sturgill Zombie". A short time later, he appeared as a police officer who is killed in a struggle with one of the protagonists in the movie Queen & Slim, and in 2020, he appeared in the horror movie The Hunt. That same year, Simpson had a supporting role in the drama film Materna.

In 2021, Simpson was cast in the upcoming Martin Scorsese film Killers of the Flower Moon as bootlegger Henry Grammer, who was involved in the Osage Indian murders. Simpson's role in the film was announced on April 6, 2021; fellow country singer Jason Isbell was also announced as being part of the cast.

Simpson has also expressed an interest in screenwriting; during a 2020 interview, he stated that he was working on a "punk rock" reboot of the 1981 film An American Werewolf in London, as well as a script based on his experiences in the Navy. Speaking on his acting career, Simpson said he did not consider himself an actor, "just a creative person seeking expression wherever that may come from."

Musical style
Simpson's overall sound was described by Indiewire as "a mesmerizing and sometimes bewildering mix of traditional country sounds, contemporary philosophy, and psychedelic recording-studio wizardry." Simpson cites Merle Haggard, Willie Nelson, Keith Whitley, and Marty Robbins as large influences on his music. However, Simpson is also frequently compared to Waylon Jennings, and his style to the outlaw country genre of country music. Waylon Jennings' son Shooter Jennings says, "Sturgill isn't imitating at all, and he sounds like my favorite era of my dad, the Seventies, when he would sing quieter and more conversational. That's what struck me about Sturgill from Day One. And still does." Country Music Television suggested that Simpson has "a voice that recalls Merle Haggard [and] guitar licks that bring Buck Owens to mind."

Personal life
Simpson's song "Oh Sarah", from his album A Sailor's Guide to Earth, is dedicated to his wife, and the record as a whole is dedicated to his first son. The couple has three sons.

Simpson is a Kentucky Colonel, having been honoured at the Kentucky State Capitol on March 20, 2018. Rep. James Kay described Simpson as "independent" and "very proud to be from our great Commonwealth," calling Metamodern Sounds in Country Music "one of the best albums of all time ... pure Kentucky and ... pure Sturgill Simpson."

Simpson has been open about his struggles with substance abuse and mental health issues. In a 2020 interview, he said that he had been pursuing his own forms of self-care, including cutting sugar from his diet, racing rally cars, participating in shooting ranges, and ignoring news regarding the 2020 presidential election. In the same interview, he described his political views as not leaning "one way or the other" and classified himself as an anarchist. Simpson also took up horseback riding before filming his role in Killers of the Flower Moon.

In 2015, Simpson denied media speculation that he was an atheist, replying that he has a tattoo of Jesus' name.

Discography

Albums

Singles

As lead artist

as featured artist

Other charted songs

Music videos

Filmography

Television

Awards and nominations

References

External links

 
 

1978 births
Living people
American country singer-songwriters
American male singer-songwriters
Grammy Award winners
People from Jackson, Kentucky
United States Navy sailors
Country musicians from Kentucky
Singer-songwriters from Kentucky
Atlantic Records artists
21st-century American singers
21st-century American male singers
Loose Music artists
Elektra Records artists
Thirty Tigers artists